Eucercosaurus (meaning "good-tailed lizard") is the name given to a genus of ornithopod dinosaur from the Albian stage of the Early Cretaceous. It was an ornithopod discovered in the Cambridge Greensand of England and is known from 19 centra, 3 sacrals, 4 dorsals and 12 caudals, and a neural arch found near Trumpington, Cambridgeshire.  The type species, E. tanyspondylus, was described by British paleontologist Harry Seeley in 1879. It is considered a dubious name, and was once considered an ankylosaur. According to a 2020 study, Eucercosaurus and Syngonosaurus were basal iguanodontians.

References

Ornithopods
Albian life
Early Cretaceous dinosaurs of Europe
Cretaceous England
Fossils of England
Fossil taxa described in 1879
Taxa named by Harry Seeley
Nomina dubia
Ornithischian genera